The 1896 Nevada State Sagebrushers football team was an American football team that represented Nevada State University (now known as the University of Nevada, Reno) as an independent during the 1896 college football season. The Sagebrushers were led by Frank Taylor in his first and only year as head coach.

Schedule

References

Nevada State
Nevada Wolf Pack football seasons
Nevada State Sagebrushers football